KALY-LP (101.7 FM) is a low-power broadcast radio station licensed to Minneapolis, Minnesota.
The station broadcasts from a tower in the Phillips West neighborhood of Minneapolis, near I-35W.

References

External links

African culture in Minnesota
Radio stations in Minnesota
Hennepin County, Minnesota
Low-power FM radio stations in Minnesota
Somali-American history
Radio stations established in 2015
2015 establishments in Minnesota